Mutis may refer to:

People
 Álvaro Mutis (1923–2013), Colombian poet
 Guido Mutis (1934–2008), Chilean professor of English
 Jeff Mutis (born 1966), U.S. baseball player
 José Celestino Mutis (1732–1808), Spanish priest, mathematician, botanist
 Julio Carrizosa Mutis, Colombian businessman
 Mario Mutis (born 1947), Chilean musician
 Olivier Mutis (born 1978), French tennis player

Places
 Mount Mutis, West Timor, East Nusa Tenggara, Indonesia; a mountain

Other uses
 "Mutis", a botanical abbreviation for José Celestino Mutis
 Castilleja mutis (C. mutis), a herbaceous flowering plant

See also

 Ramón Muttis (1899–1955), Argentinian soccer player
 Muthis, Egyptian pharaoh
 
 Muti (disambiguation)